Beena Kannan is an Indian business woman, who is the CEO and lead designer of Seematti textiles.

After university, she joined the family textile retailing business 'Seematti' in 1980, working with her father and husband. Seematti was started by her pioneering grandfather, the famous textile king Veeriah Reddiar. She became one of the most noticed wedding silk sari designers in south India. Her unique contribution appears to be her efforts to retain the pride of place for saris even in the face of onslaught from Western and North Indian fashions. Beena Kannan attracted attention when the longest ever silk sari created by her (half a km long) entered the Guinness Book of Records and Limca Book of Records in 2007. She has launched her sari designs in UAE (2007) and the United States (2009). Her rapport with the weaving communities earned for her a "Lifetime Achievement Award" from Coimbatore Erode Weaving community in 2009. In September 2011, Beena Kannan-designed saris walked the "Swarovski Elements 2011″ Ramp.

References 

Living people
Year of birth missing (living people)
Place of birth missing (living people)

Artists from Kottayam
Businesspeople from Kottayam
Businesswomen from Kerala
Indian women fashion designers
Women artists from Kerala